The 1950 Hamilton Tiger-Cats season was the first in franchise history after the two local clubs, the Hamilton Tigers and Hamilton Wildcats, amalgamated before this season began. The new franchise competed in the Interprovincial Rugby Football Union, the highest level of play in Eastern Canada.

The Tiger-Cats finished in 1st place in the East Division with a 7–5 record but lost the East Final in a two-game series to the Toronto Argonauts.

Preseason

Regular season

Season Standings

Season schedule

Playoffs

Schedule

References

Hamilton Tiger-Cats seasons
Hamilton